Dyrol Jay Burleson (born April 27, 1940) is a retired middle-distance runner from the United States. He attended the University of Oregon, where he ran track under the coach Bill Bowerman. Burleson lettered in track and field in 1960, 1961, and 1962. He won the AAU 1500 m title in 1959, 1961 and 1963, and the NCAA title in the 1500 m in 1960, and in the mile in 1961–62. Burleson was Pan American champion in 1959, and in May 1962 he anchored the Oregon 4×mile relay team that set a new world record.

In 2010 Burleson was inducted into the National Track and Field Hall of Fame.

Burleson also is a member of the Cottage Grove High School Hall of Fame and holds the 1500m record in track and field at the high school.

Accomplishments 
 1960 Summer Olympic Games 1500 meters: 3:40.9 (6th place)
 1964 Summer Olympic Games 1500 meters: 3:40.0 (5th place)
 1960 American Record holder 1500 meters : 3:41.3
 1960 American Record holder 1500 meters : 3:40.9
 1960 American Record holder 1 Mile : 3:58.6
 1961 American Record holder 1 Mile : 3:57.6

References

External links
 
 
 

1940 births
Living people
American male middle-distance runners
Oregon Ducks men's track and field athletes
Olympic track and field athletes of the United States
Medalists at the 1959 Pan American Games
Athletes (track and field) at the 1960 Summer Olympics
Athletes (track and field) at the 1964 Summer Olympics
Pan American Games gold medalists for the United States
Pan American Games medalists in athletics (track and field)
Athletes (track and field) at the 1959 Pan American Games
People from Cottage Grove, Oregon
Track and field athletes from Oregon